Filip Dmitrović (Serbian Cyrillic: филип Дмитровић; born 28 July 1995) is a Serbian footballer who plays as a goalkeeper for Greek Super League 2 club Anagennisi Karditsa.

Club career
Dmitrović began his career in Graz, Austria at Mariatrost. Having played in Serbia at Partizan, Borac Čačak and Teleoptik Zemun, he returned to Austria for Austria Klagenfurt. In 2015 after the rise in professional football, he was in the first round on July 24, 2015 at 4:0 home win against Liefering his pro debut.

After the injury of Pavao Pervan, Dmitrović was committed from second division side LASK Linz on August 3, 2016. As with the Austria Klagenfurt he made his debut for the Black and Whites on August 5, 2016 away game against Liefering.

International career
Dmitrović has represented the Serbia at the under-U20 level.

Personal life
Dmitrović is the son of former Serbian international footballer Boban Dmitrović.

Career statistics

References

External links

1995 births
Living people
Serbian footballers
Association football goalkeepers
FK Teleoptik players
SK Austria Klagenfurt players
LASK players
SC Rheindorf Altach players
SKN St. Pölten players
SV Ried players
Enosi Panaspropyrgiakou Doxas players
2. Liga (Austria) players
Austrian Football Bundesliga players
Austrian Regionalliga players
Serbian expatriate footballers
Expatriate footballers in Austria
Expatriate footballers in Greece